Skyy (also known as New York Skyy) was an American R&B/funk/disco band based in New York City. They are perhaps best known for their 1981 hit, "Call Me", as well as their 1989 "comeback" hits, "Start of a Romance" and "Real Love".

Career
Skyy was formed in Brooklyn, New York in 1977. The original line-up consisted of sisters Denise, Delores, and Bonny Dunning as vocalists, with guitarists Solomon Roberts and Anibal Anthony Sierra, keyboardist Larry Greenberg, bassist Gerald Lebon, and drummer Tommy McConnell. In 1978 the band was signed to Salsoul Records, releasing their debut album the following year.

After several albums that yielded moderate hits on the R&B charts, the group crossed over to the US pop charts with the release of the Skyy Line album in late 1981. Featured on this album was the single "Call Me" which reached number 26 on the Billboard Hot 100 charts and was their first number 1 on the R&B charts. The album was later certified Gold by the RIAA. The band continued to record for the Salsoul label through to the release of their 1984 Inner City album.

In the mid-1980s, the band signed with Capitol Records and released their next album, From the Left Side in 1986. Apart from the top ten R&B single, "Givin' It (to You)", the album saw limited success, and the group left Capitol soon thereafter. 

In 1989, after signing to Atlantic Records, Skyy launched a comeback with the release of their Start of a Romance album. This release yielded two number one R&B singles, "Start of a Romance" and "Real Love". "Real Love" also became the group's second and final crossover pop hit peaking at number 47 on the Billboard Hot 100 chart in early 1990. By the release of the Nearer to You album in 1992, the hits were less successful, and the band has not released a new studio album since then. 

The sisters have performed consistently since then. In 2007 they attempted to beat a Guinness World Record for the largest kazoo band at the Summerstage Concert Series in Harlem USA, singing their song Skyyzoo. Other notable performances have included the Salsoul Reunion Concert, where they performed with former label mates Carol Williams, Double Exposure, Instant Funk and Joe Bataan in New York City.

Discography

Studio albums

Compilation albums
Skyy Flyy (1982, Salsoul)
Greatest Hits (1996, The Right Stuff)
The Anthology (2006, Suss'd)
Skyyhigh: The Skyy Anthology 1979–1992 (2014, Big Break)

Singles

References

External links

American dance music groups
American funk musical groups
Musical groups established in 1977
Musical groups from New York City
Salsoul Records artists